Dorit is a given name, the Hebrew version of Doris, and may refer to:

Dorit Aharonov (born 1970), Israeli computer scientist specializing in quantum computing
Dorit Bar Or (born 1975), Israeli actress and fashion designer
Dorit Beinisch (born 1942), 9th president of the Supreme Court of Israel
Dorit Chrysler (born 1966), Austrian electronic musician
Dorit Cypis (born 1951), Israeli American artist and mediator
Dorit Jellinek, Miss Israel 1978
Dorit Kemsley, television personality on The Real Housewives of Beverly Hills
Dorit Rubinstein Reiss (born 1972-73), immunization advocate

See also
Dorrit, a given name

German feminine given names